Denis Amici (born 10 June 1972) is a Sammarinese politician who served as Captain Regent of San Marino alongside Antonella Mularoni from April 2013 until October 2013.

Biography
Amici was born June 10, 1972 in the City of San Marino, San Marino, a small country in Europe completely surrounded by Italy. Amici has a degree in Accounting and Business, taking over his father's company in 1999. He first entered politics in 2008 and is a member of the Sammarinese Christian Democratic Party. Amici was elected to the parliament in 2012. On March 21, 2013 Amici, together with Antonella Mularoni, was elected joint Captain Regent of San Marino for a six-month term, starting on April 1 and ending October 1. Amici lives in Fiorentino, one of the nine municipalities of the country.

References

1972 births
Living people
Captains Regent of San Marino
Sammarinese Christian Democratic Party politicians
Members of the Grand and General Council
20th-century politicians
21st-century Sammarinese politicians